Francis Carlyle (17 September 1912 - 27 December 1975) was a professional magician who was a regular and popular performer at Hollywood's Magic Castle.

History
Francis Carlyle was born Francis Xavier Finneran.  He was born in Fall River, Massachusetts and lived most of his life in New York, living at one time in Greenwich Village.  He was well known and regarded by his peers, contributing his tricks to several books on magic.  He was a regular and popular performer at Hollywood's Magic Castle in their close-up room, specializing in card and coin magic.  He also performed at notable clubs such as the Stork Club in New York.  Later (at least from 1964), problems with alcohol made it difficult for him to continue professionally performing magic, and eventually to be barred from performing at the Magic Castle.

In 1975, fellow magician Ricky Jay encountered Carlyle living in the streets of Los Angeles, and put him up for a few days at his home in nearby Venice in an effort to help Carlyle get back on his feet.  But Carlyle relapsed, and was found unconscious on a Hollywood street shortly thereafter.  He was taken to a convalescent home, where he died on 27 December 1975.

Featured in the following Books
Card Manipulations N° 5 By Jean Hugard -- 

Stars of Magic, Series 4 By George Starke -- 

The Magic of Francis Carlyle By Roger Pierre -- 

Scarne On Card Tricks By John Scarne—1950, Scarne On Card Tricks, published by Crown Publishers, New York

See also
List of magicians
Card magic
sleight of hand

References

External links

1912 births
1975 deaths
Sleight of hand
Card magic
American magicians
Academy of Magical Arts Visiting Magician of the Year winners